Colin James Brazier (born 6 June 1957) is an English former professional footballer who played as a defender in the Football League for Wolverhampton Wanderers, Birmingham City, Lincoln City and Walsall, and in the North American Soccer League for the Jacksonville Tea Men.

Career
Brazier began his career with Wolverhampton Wanderers as an apprentice in 1973, turning professional two years later, and made his senior debut on 2 February 1977 in a 1–0 win over Ipswich Town in the FA Cup. Although he managed 91 appearances for the team over five seasons, he was never able to become a regular player. His best run of games came in the latter half of the 1979–80 season; he was included in the matchday squad for the 1980 League Cup Final at Wembley, but ended up as an unused substitute as Wolves defeated Nottingham Forest. He played his last game for the club in February 1982.

He joined Birmingham City in October 1982 after completing his second season playing for the Jacksonville Tea Men in the North American Soccer League, but left the club a few months later after a disagreement with the manager. He played one game for AP Leamington and ended the season with Lincoln City. He spent three seasons back in the Midlands with Walsall before joining Conference club Kidderminster Harriers. With Kidderminster, Brazier won the FA Trophy in 1987, reached the final of the 1989 Welsh Cup, and was capped by the England semi-professional team. He finished his career at Tamworth.

References

1957 births
Living people
Sportspeople from Solihull
English footballers
England semi-pro international footballers
Association football defenders
Wolverhampton Wanderers F.C. players
Jacksonville Tea Men players
Birmingham City F.C. players
Leamington F.C. players
Lincoln City F.C. players
Walsall F.C. players
Kidderminster Harriers F.C. players
Tamworth F.C. players
English Football League players
North American Soccer League (1968–1984) players
National League (English football) players
English expatriate sportspeople in the United States
Expatriate soccer players in the United States
English expatriate footballers